Fiona Michelle Alessandri Wildy (born 5 November 1967) is an Australian swimmer. She competed in four events at the 1988 Summer Olympics.

References

External links
 

1967 births
Living people
Australian female swimmers
Olympic swimmers of Australia
Swimmers at the 1988 Summer Olympics
Place of birth missing (living people)